Kaithora is a village in Badlapur tahsil, Jaunpur district, Uttar Pradesh, India.  The population was 655 at the 2011 Indian census.

References

Villages in Jaunpur district